James Sanford (born June 18, 1984) is a Canadian professional ice hockey defenceman. He is currently playing for the Trenton Titans in the ECHL.

Career 
On August 25, 2011, the Dayton Gems of the Central Hockey League signed Sanford as a free agent for the 2011–12 season. On December 10, 2011, Sanford was signed by the Trenton Titans of the ECHL.

References

External links

1984 births
Living people
Canadian ice hockey defencemen
Chicago Wolves players
Dayton Gems players
Gold Coast Blue Tongues players
Hamilton Bulldogs (AHL) players
Hull Stingrays players
Ice hockey people from Ontario
Long Beach Ice Dogs (ECHL) players
Melbourne Mustangs players
Milwaukee Admirals players
Moncton Wildcats players
Odessa Jackalopes players
Peoria Rivermen (AHL) players
Sportspeople from Timmins
Texas Wildcatters players
Utah Grizzlies (AHL) players
Victoriaville Tigres players
Orlando Solar Bears (ECHL) players
Reading Royals players
Trenton Titans players
Canadian expatriate ice hockey players in England